In March 2017 President of Sri Lanka Maithripala Sirisena awarded national honours to 90 individuals for distinguished services. It was the first time in twelve years that awards were given out and there were 426 applicants. The awards ceremony was held on 20 March 2017 at the Nelum Pokuna Theatre in Colombo.

Sri Lankabhimanya
 W. D. Amaradeva

Deshamanya
 Abbasally Akbarally
 K. M. de Silva
 Tissa Devendra
 Colvin De Fonseka Warnasuriya Goonaratna
 Thalagalage Amaradasa Gunawardana
 Devanesan Nesiah
 Diyunuge Nandadasa Rajapaksha
 Priyani Soysa
 Latha Walpola
 Mineka Presantha Wickramasingha

Deshabandu 
 Leslie Shelton Devendra
 Deivanayagam Eassuwaren
 Susanthika Jayasinghe
 Mahinkande Gamladdalage Kularatne
 Ranjan Madugalle
 Thommadura Pabilis Silva
 Lakshman Lucian de Silva Weerasena
 W. K. H. Wegapitiya
 Shan Wickremesinghe

Vidya Jyothi
 Lal Gotabhaya Chandrasena
 Harendra de Silva
 Errol Radcliffe Jansz
 Moderage Marian Rohan Waas Jayasekara
 Sarath Kotagama
 Mahamendige Wilfred Joseph Gerard Mendis
 Colvin Ananda Samarasinghe
 De Silva T. K. Nimal Padmasena
 Alagiyawanna Mohotti Appuhamillage Nimal Kitsiri Senanayake
 Tissa Vitharana
 Bandula Wijayarathna

Kala Keerthi
 Wijesinghe Arachchilage Abeysingha
 Hapuwalanege Don Ariyadasa (Dasa Hapuwalana)
 Arun Dias Bandaranaike
 Lionel Bentharage
 Herman Ronald Lakshman De Alwis
 Nellampitiya Pathirana Arachchige Dayawathi (Daya Nellampitiya)
 Ivor Dennis
 Ranasinghe Arachchige Jayantha Prema Lal Hegoda
 Gunawardhana Mudalige Ajith Hemachandra
 George Edmond Jayasinghe
 Sumana Jayatillake
 Sunanda Mahendra
 Suresh Maliyadde
 G. Kartini Drahaman Mohamed
 Camillus Perera
 Edmand Ranasinghe
 Madhubhashini Disanayaka Ratnayaka
 Lalitha Sarathchandra
 Suminda Sirisena
 Singarampillai Thillanadarajah
 Saravanai Vinayagamoorthy
 Namel Weeramuni

Sri Lanka Sikhamani
 Hetti Arachchige Piyadasa Abeywardane
 Achi Mohamed Ishaq
 Chulamani Gedara Gunasoma Nawarathne
 S. Pathmanathan
 Leelananda Prematilleke
 Krishnamoorthi Ratnam Ravindran
 Sellapuliyage Lucian Benedict Rosa

Vidya Nidhi
 Don Tilak Dias Jayaweera Abeysekera
 Ahmed Mumtaz Masoon Cassim
 Vithanage Nimal Chandrasiri Gunasekera
 Herath Peruma Mudiyanselage Gunasena
 Sarath Somasiri Gunawardhana
 Mariapillai Sellamuthu Pillai Mookiah
 Lekamage Ramsay Lloyd Perera
 Somasundaram Sandarasegaram
 S. Sivananthan
 Wanninayake Mudiyanselage Tikiri Banda Wanninayake

Kala Suri
 Pahalage Sarath Vijaya de Silva Abeygunawardana
 Arumadura Praneeth Nishad De Silva Abhayasundere
 Sriyani Amarasena
 Lucien Bulathsinhala
 Premasara Epasinghe
 Nita Fernando
 Nawarathne Gamage
 Mestiyage Don Bertie Sangathissa Gunathilaka
 Hasantha Srilal Hettiarachchi
 Weerappulige Jayasiri
 Cathleen Jayawardana
 Tissa Mahanama Nagodawithana
 Sumithra Rahubadda
 Sella Hennedige Sarath

Sri Lanka Thilaka
 Adagamage Pandula Adagama
 Hema Bandara Jayasinghe

Veera Prathapa
 Aluth Gedara Ranjith Amarajeewa
 Rankoth Gedara Shanaka Prasad Kumara

Sri Lanka Ranajana
 Sarath Gunapala
 Siddhartha Kaul

References

Sri Lanka National Honours
National Honours
Civil awards and decorations of Sri Lanka